Hugo Barth (20 November 1903 – 5 May 1976) was a German athlete. He competed in the men's decathlon at the 1928 Summer Olympics.

References

External links
 

1903 births
1976 deaths
Athletes (track and field) at the 1928 Summer Olympics
German decathletes
Olympic athletes of Germany
Sportspeople from Karlsruhe (region)
People from Freudenstadt (district)